The Diving competition in the 1977 Summer Universiade were held in Sofia, Bulgaria.

Medal overview

Medal table

References
 
 
 
  (Men's springboard and women's platform)
  (Men's platform)
 (Women's springboard)
  (Springboard)
 

1977 Summer Universiade
1977
1977 in diving